Sandra C. Cano (born 1983) is an American politician from the state of Rhode Island. She serves in the Rhode Island Senate, representing District 8. Cano is a member of the Democratic Party.

Early life
Cano was born in Medellín, Colombia. In 2000, at the age of 16, she moved with her family to the United States.  She graduated from Bryant University, the University of Rhode Island's graduate program in public administration, and Harvard University's Executive Leadership Program.

Career
Cano served as an at-large city councilwoman for Pawtucket, Rhode Island after serving on the city's school board. She won a special election on April 3, 2018, to succeed James Doyle II in the Rhode Island Senate.

On January 12, 2021, Cano was appointed chairperson of the Senate Committee on Education for the 2021-2022 session.

Personal life
Cano's fiance, James Diossa, is the general treasurer of Rhode Island. They have a daughter.

References

American politicians of Colombian descent
Hispanic and Latino American state legislators in Rhode Island
Hispanic and Latino American women in politics
Living people
Rhode Island city council members
Politicians from Pawtucket, Rhode Island
People from Medellín
Bryant University alumni
University of Rhode Island alumni
Women state legislators in Rhode Island
Women city councillors in Rhode Island
Democratic Party Rhode Island state senators
21st-century American politicians
21st-century American women politicians
1983 births